Staré Město ("Old Town") is administratively a part of the town of Třinec in Frýdek-Místek District, Moravian-Silesian Region, Czech Republic. It is the historical centre of the town. It lies in the historical region of Cieszyn Silesia and has a population of 5,713 (1 January 2008).

Staré Město is a place where the main urban settlement grew alongside Třinec Iron and Steel Works from the 19th century up to World War II. In 1946 merged with the town was the village of Lyžbice where in the 1950s the ruling Communist Party of Czechoslovakia began a large scale development in the style of socialist realism. Afterwards Lyžbice became a new downtown, overtaking the role from Staré Město (lit. Old Town).

References 

Třinec
Neighbourhoods in the Czech Republic